Tom Tyler (born Vincent Markowski; August 9, 1903 – May 1, 1954) was an American actor known for his leading roles in low-budget Western films in the silent and sound eras, and for his portrayal of superhero Captain Marvel in the 1941 serial film The Adventures of Captain Marvel. Tyler also played Kharis in 1940's The Mummy's Hand, a popular Universal Studios monster film.

Early years
Tyler was born Vincent Markowski or Markowsky (Vincas Markauskas) (sources differ) in Port Henry, New York, to Lithuanian-American parents Helen (née Elena Montvila) and Frank Markowski (Pranas Markauskas) . he had two brothers: Frank Jr. and Joe (who changed his last name to Marko) and two sisters: Katherine (Mrs. Slepski) and Maliane "Molly" (Mrs. Redge). He made his First Communion in a small church in Mineville around 1910. His father and older brother worked in the mines for the Witherbee Sherman Company.

In 1913, his family moved to Hamtramck, Michigan, where he attended St. Florian Elementary School and Hamtramck High School. After graduating from high school, he left home and made his way west, finding work as a seaman on a merchant steamer in the U.S. Merchant Marine, a coal miner in Pennsylvania, a lumberjack in the Northwest, and even a prizefighter.

Weightlifting
Tyler was an amateur weightlifter sponsored by the Los Angeles Athletic Club during the late 1920s. He set a new world's amateur record for the right-hand clean and jerk by lifting . In 1928, he won the Amateur Athletic Union (AAU) heavyweight weightlifting championship, lifting —a record that stood for fourteen years.

Early film career
Around 1924, Tyler arrived in California and found work in the film industry as a prop man and extra. His first screen appearances as an extra included Three Weeks (1924), Leatherstocking (1924), and Wild Horse Mesa (1925). In 1925, Tyler was signed to a contract with Film Booking Offices of America (FBO) to star in a series of western adventures with a starting salary of about $75 per week. His first starring role was in Let's Go, Gallagher (1925). Over the next four years, he starred in 28 additional westerns for FBO, including The Masquerade Bandit (1926), The Sonora Kid (1927), The Texas Tornado (1928), The Avenging Rider (1928), and Pride of the Pawnee (1929). While romance was generally underplayed in these early westerns, a number of up-and-coming heroines—including Doris Hill, Jean Arthur, and Nora Lane—contributed to the overall appeal of Tyler's films, which enjoyed critical praise and were popular with Saturday matinee audiences. His four years with FBO gave him valuable riding and acting experience and made him a popular cowboy hero in the latter years of the silent film era.

In 1929, Tyler signed with Syndicate Pictures, where he made his last eight silent films in 1929 and 1930, including The Man from Nevada (1929), Pioneers of the West (1929), The Canyon of Missing Men (1930), and Call of the Desert (1930). In 1930, Tyler was loaned out to Mascot Pictures for his first "all talking" sound film, The Phantom of the West, a typical ten-chapter Saturday matinee cowboy cliffhanger featuring a mysterious secret villain and numerous stunts and action sequences. Kermit Maynard, the brother of Ken Maynard, was Tyler's stunt double in the more dangerous sequences. In 1931, Tyler made his first Syndicate sound film, West of Cheyenne, which showcased his excellent voice for westerns despite his awkward delivery of lines. Tyler concluded his tenure with Syndicate Pictures with Rider of the Plains (1931) and God's Country and the Man (1931). He was also strongly considered for the role of Tarzan by MGM in their Tarzan the Ape Man (1932)

Monogram Pictures
Syndicate merged into Monogram Pictures, which signed Tom Tyler to an eight-picture contract as part of the company's sagebrush series. These typical low-budget "quickies" included Man from Death Valley (1931), Single-Handed Sanders (1932), The Man from New Mexico (1932), and Honor of the Mounted (1932), each made for about $8000. All of his Monogram films received critical and popular support. When Monogram chose Bob Steele to star in the next season's series, Tyler moved over to Universal to do three chapter plays—a safari yarn called Jungle Mystery (1932), Clancy of the Mounted (1933), and Phantom of the Air (1933)—while managing to fit in four low-budget Westerns for John R. Freuler's Monarch Pictures, including The Forty-Niners (1932), When a Man Rides Alone (1933), Deadwood Pass (1933), and War on the Range (1933).

Reliable Pictures and Victory Pictures
In 1934, Tyler signed a two-year contract with Harry S. Webb's Reliable Pictures for eighteen low-budget western films, tailored as second features on double bills for second- and third-tier movie houses. These films included Mystery Ranch (1934), The Silver Bullet (1935), Born to Battle (1935), Silent Valley (1935), Fast Bullets (1936), and Santa Fe Bound (1936). Despite a few well-done scenes and some good performances by supporting players such as Slim Whitaker, Charles King, Earl Dwire, and even the silent-era "Hebrew" comedian Max Davidson, most of these films were of average quality with production shortcomings that restricted the effectiveness of Tyler's performances. By 1936, companies such as Republic Pictures and Paramount Pictures were producing larger-budget, better-quality western films with impressive exterior locations that overshadowed the type of Poverty Row low-budget offerings that brought Tyler to fame.

In 1936, Tyler signed a two-year contract with Sam Katzman's new Victory Pictures for eight western films, each budgeted at about $6000. The first five of these films were directed by Bob Hill and included Cheyenne Rides Again (1937) with Lucile Brown and Feud of the Trail (1937), in which Tyler played a dual role. Of lesser quality, the final three included two co-starring his wife, Jeanne Martel: Orphan of the Pecos (1937) and Lost Ranch (1937), the latter containing a rare scene in which Tyler lip syncs two songs, "Tucson Mary" and "Home on the Range". Following Brothers of the West (1937), Katzman did not renew Tyler's contract with Victory, replacing him with Tim McCoy as the company's top western star.

With no starring roles being offered to him, Tyler took a job with the Wallace Brothers Circus in 1938. He returned to Hollywood and appeared in supporting roles and bit parts in several feature films, including John Ford's Stagecoach (1939) with John Wayne, Drums Along the Mohawk (1939) with Henry Fonda, Gone With the Wind (1939) with Clark Gable, The Westerner (1940) with Gary Cooper, and John Ford's The Grapes of Wrath (1940) (also with Henry Fonda).  His most unusual role was that of Kharis the mummy in Universal's The Mummy's Hand (1940), in which he was cast because the studio felt he resembled a younger Boris Karloff well enough to match stock footage of Karloff from The Mummy (1932).

Republic Pictures and popular serials
In 1941, Tyler signed a two-year contract with Republic Pictures to star in 13 films in the popular Three Mesquiteers series in the role of Stony Brooke opposite Bob Steele playing Tucson Smith, and Rufe Davis or Jimmie Dodd playing Lullaby Joslin. Tyler's $150-per-week salary during the first year was increased to $200 per week for the second year. These final 13 films in the Three Mesquiteers series (39 through 51) represent some of Tyler's best work, and his last leading roles: Outlaws of Cherokee Trail (1941), Gauchos of El Dorado (1941), West of Cimarron (1941), Code of the Outlaw (1942), Raiders of the Range (1942), Westward Ho (1942), The Phantom Plainsmen (1942), Shadows on the Sage (1942), Valley of Hunted Men (1942), Thundering Trails (1943), The Blocked Trail (1943), Santa Fe Scouts (1943), and Riders of the Rio Grande (1943), the last film in the series.

During this period Republic, which failed to secure the rights to Superman, purchased the rights to another comic book superhero, Captain Marvel. In his late thirties at the time, Tyler was still in good shape and was offered the title role at $250 per week for four weeks' work. In the title role in The Adventures of Captain Marvel (1941), Tyler portrayed the first film adaptation of a comic book superhero.

Tyler's last major screen role was in the Columbia Pictures serial The Phantom (1943), based on Lee Falk's comic strip. In costume, Tyler bore a striking resemblance to the Phantom character, and he delivered one of his best performances. Columbia filmed a sequel to The Phantom more than a decade later, but the studio's rights to the Phantom property had lapsed. Producer Sam Katzman was forced to film new scenes with actor John Hart, who wore a new costume. The patchwork was released as The Adventures of Captain Africa (1955), and footage of Tyler's Phantom appears in some of the long shots.

Later years
In 1943, the forty-year-old Tyler was diagnosed with severe rheumatoid arthritis. He was physically limited to occasional supporting roles in western films, including San Antonio (1945) with Errol Flynn; They Were Expendable (1945), Red River (1948), and She Wore a Yellow Ribbon (1949) with John Wayne; Badman's Territory (1946) with Randolph Scott; Masked Raiders (1949), Riders of the Range (1950), Rio Grande Patrol (1951), and Road Agent (1952) with Tim Holt; West of the Brazos (1950) and several other films with James Ellison; Trail of Robin Hood (1950) with Roy Rogers; and Best of the Badmen (1951) with Robert Ryan. Tyler was one of the John Ford Stock Company, appearing in six of the director's films.

Beginning in 1950, Tyler transitioned to television work, finding minor roles on The Lone Ranger (1950), Dick Tracy (1950), The Cisco Kid (1950–1951), The Range Rider (1951–1952), and The Roy Rogers Show (1952). His final television appearances were in four episodes of The Gene Autry Show in 1952 and 1953. The last screen appearance by Tom Tyler was as a "District Marshal" on the television series Steve Donovan, Western Marshal. The episode, called "Comanche Kid," premiered on January 14, 1956, but had been filmed as a pilot in 1950. In it, Tyler had difficulty drawing his gun because of his arthritis.

Marriage
Tyler married actress Jeanne Martel in September 1937; they met the previous year while filming Santa Fe Bound, in which she was his leading lady. They appeared in two other films together in 1937, Lost Ranch and Orphan of the Pecos. She most likely accompanied him on the road with the Wallace Brothers Circus in 1938. According to a United States census, they were still married in May 1940 but most likely separated and divorced soon after.

Death
Suffering from severe rheumatoid arthritis and nearly destitute, Tyler moved back to Hamtramck and lived with his sister, Katherine Slepski, during the last year of his life. He died on May 3, 1954 of heart failure and complications from scleroderma at the age of 50. He was buried in Mount Olivet Cemetery in Detroit.

Filmography

 Three Weeks (1924) - Extra (uncredited)
 Leatherstocking (1924) - Indian
 Wild Horse Mesa (1925) - Cowboy
Let's Go, Gallagher (1925) - Tom Gallagher
The Wyoming Wildcat (1925) - Phil Stone
 The Only Thing (1925) - Party Guest (uncredited)
 The Cowboy Musketeer (1925) - Tom Latigo
 Ben-Hur: A Tale of the Christ (1925) - Charioteer (uncredited)
 Born to Battle (1926) - Dennis Terhune
 The Arizona Streak  (1926) - Dandy Carrell
 Wild to Go (1926) - Tom Blake
 The Masquerade Bandit (1926) - Jeff Morton
 The Cowboy Cop (1926) - Jerry McGill
 Tom and His Pals (1926) - Tom Duffy
 Out of the West (1926) - Tom Hanley
 Red Hot Hoofs (1926) - Tom Buckley
 Lightning Lariats (1927) - Tom Potter
 The Sonora Kid (1927) - Tom MacReady
 Cyclone of the Range (1927) - Tom MacKay
 Splitting the Breeze (1927) - Death Valley Drake
 Tom's Gang (1927) - Dave Collins
 The Flying U Ranch (1927) - Señor Miguel García
 The Cherokee Kid (1927) - Bill Duncan
 The Desert Pirate (1927) - Tom Corrigan
 The Texas Tornado (1928) - Tom Jones
 When the Law Rides (1928) - Tom O'Malley
 Phantom of the Range (1928) - Duke Carlton
 Terror Mountain (1928) - Himself
 The Avenging Rider (1928) - Tom Larkin
 Tyrant of Red Gulch (1928) - Tom Masters
 Trail of the Horse Thieves (1929) - Vic Stanley
 Gun Law (1929) - Tom O'Brien
 Idaho Red (1929) - Andy Thornton
 The Pride of Pawnee (1929) - Kirk Stockton
 The Law of the Plains (1929) - O'Brien
 The Man from Nevada (1929) - Jack Carter
 The Phantom Rider (1929) - Dick Cartwright
 The Lone Horseman (1929) - Jack Gardner
 Pioneers of the West (1929) - Phil Sampson
 'Neath Western Skies (1929) - Tex McCloud
 Call of the Desert (1930) - Rex Carson
 Half Pint Polly (1930, Short) - Don Wilson
 The Canyon of Missing Men (1930) - Dave Brandon
 Her Man (1930) - Sailor (uncredited)
 The Phantom of the West (1931, serial) - Jim Lester
 West of Cheyenne (1931) - Tom Langdon
 God's Country and the Man (1931) - Tex Malone
 Rider of the Plains (1931) - Blackie Saunders
 Partners of the Trail (1931) - Larry Condon
 The Man from Death Valley (1931) - Dave
 Two Fisted Justice (1931) - "Kentucky" Carson
 Battling with Buffalo Bill (1931) - William Cody
 Galloping Thru (1931) - Tom McGuire
 Single-Handed Sanders (1932) - Matt Sanders
 The Man from New Mexico (1932) - Jess Ryder
 Vanishing Men (1932) - Sheriff Doug Barrett
 Honor of the Mounted (1932) - Constable Tom Halliday
 Jungle Mystery (1932, serial) - Kirk Montgomery
 The Forty-Niners (1932) - "Tennessee" Matthews
 When a Man Rides Alone (1933) - The Llano Kid
 Clancy of the Mounted (1933, serial) - Sergeant Tom Clancy
 The Phantom of the Air (1933, serial) - Bob Raymond
 War of the Range (1933) - Tom Bradley
 Ridin' Thru (1934) - Tom Saunders
 Mystery Ranch (1934) - Bob Morris
 Fighting Hero (1934) - Tom Hall
 Terror of the Plains (1934) - Tom Lansing
 Unconquered Bandit (1935) - Tom Morgan
 Coyote Trails (1935) - Tom Riley
 Tracy Rides (1935) - Sheriff Tom Tracy
 Born to Battle (1935) - "Cyclone" Tom Saunders
 Silent Valley (1935) - Sheriff Tom Hall
 The Silver Bullet  (1935) - Tom Henderson
 The Laramie Kid (1935) - Tom Talbot
 Rio Rattler (1935) - Tom Denton
 Powdersmoke Range (1935) - Sundown Saunders
 Trigger Tom (1935) - Tom Hunter
 Fast Bullets (1936) - Ranger Tom Hilton
 Ridin' On (1936) - Tom Roarke
 Roamin' Wild (1936) - Tom Barton
 Pinto Rustlers (1936) - Tom Evans
 The Last Outlaw (1936) - Al Goss
 Santa Fe Bound (1936) - Tom Crenshaw
 Rip Roarin' Buckaroo (1936) - "Scotty" McQuade
 The Phantom of the Range (1936) - Jerry Lane
 Cheyenne Rides Again (1937) - Tom "Cheyenne Tommy" Wade
 Feud of the Trail (1937) - Tom Wade / Jack Granger
 Mystery Range (1937) - Tom Wade
 Orphan of the Pecos (1937) - Tom Rayburn
 Brothers of the West (1937) - Tom Wade
 Lost Ranch (1937) - Tom Wade
 King of Alcatraz (1938) - Gus Banshek
 Stagecoach (1939) - Luke Plummer
 The Night Riders (1939) - Jackson
 Frontier Marshal (1939) - Buck Newton (uncredited)
 Drums Along the Mohawk (1939) - Capt. Morgan (uncredited)
 Gone with the Wind (1939) - Commanding Officer During Evacuation (uncredited)
 The Grapes of Wrath (1940) - Deputy (uncredited)
 The Light of Western Stars (1940) - Sheriff Tom Hawes
 Brother Orchid (1940) - Curley Matthews
 The Westerner (1940) - King Evans
 The Mummy's Hand (1940) - Kharis
 Cherokee Strip (1940) - Frank Lovell
 Texas Rangers Ride Again (1940) - Ranger Gilpin (uncredited)
 Buck Privates (1941) - Ring Announcer at Boxing Match (uncredited)
 Adventures of Captain Marvel (1941, serial) - Captain Marvel
 Border Vigilantes (1941) - Henchman Yager
 Bad Men of Missouri (1941) - Deputy Sheriff Dave (uncreidted)
 Outlaws of Cherokee Trail (1941) - Stony Brooke
 Riders of the Timberline (1941) - Henchman Bill Slade
 Gauchos of El Dorado (1941) - "Stony" Brooke
 West of Cimarron (1941) - Stony Brooke
 Code of the Outlaw (1942) - Stony Brooke
 Valley of the Sun (1942) - Geronimo
 Raiders of the Range (1942) - Stony Brooke
 Westward Ho (1942) - Stony Brooke
 The Phantom Plainsmen (1942) - Stony Brooke
 The Talk of the Town (1942) - Clyde Bracken
 Shadows on the Sage (1942) - Stony Brooke
 Valley of Hunted Men (1942) - Stony Brooke
 Thundering Trails (1943) - Stony Brooke
 The Blocked Trail (1943) - Stony Brooke
 Santa Fe Scouts (1943) - Stony Brooke
 Riders of the Rio Grande (1943) - Stony Brooke
 Wagon Tracks West (1943) - Clawtooth
 The Phantom (1943, serial) - Jeffrey Prescott, the Phantom
 Gun to Gun (1944, Short) - Captain Haines (uncredited)
 The Navy Way (1944) - Triangle A Ranch Hand (uncredited)
 Boss of Boomtown (1944) - Jim Ward
 Ladies of Washington (1944) - Agent (uncredited)
 The Princess and the Pirate (1944) - Lieutenant (uncredited)
 Sing Me a Song of Texas (1945) - Steve Andrews
 They Were Expendable (1945) - Captain at Airport (uncredited)
 San Antonio (1945) - Lafe McWilliams
 Badman's Territory (1946) - Frank James
 Never Say Goodbye (1946) - Policeman (uncredited)
 Cheyenne (1947) - Pecos
 The Dude Goes West (1948) - Spiggoty
 Return of the Bad Men (1948) - Wild Bill Yeager
 Red River (1948) - Quitter (uncredited)
 The Golden Eye (1948) - Minor Role (scenes deleted)
 The Three Musketeers (1948) - 1st Traveller (uncredited)
 Blood on the Moon (1948) - Frank Reardon
 I Shot Jesse James (1949) - Frank James
 The Younger Brothers (1949) - Hatch
 The Beautiful Blonde from Bashful Bend (1949) - Townsman (uncredited)
 Lust for Gold (1949) - Luke (uncredited)
 She Wore a Yellow Ribbon (1949) - Cpl. Mike Quayne
 Masked Raiders (1949) - Trig Trevett
 Square Dance Jubilee (1949) - Henchman Buck
 Samson and Delilah (1949) - Gristmill Captain (uncredited)
 Riders of the Range (1950) - The Ringo Kid
 The Daltons' Women (1950) - Emmett Dalton
 Hostile Country (1950) - Tom Brady
 Marshal of Heldorado (1950) - Mike Tulliver
 Crooked River (1950) - Henchman Weston
 Colorado Ranger (1950) - Henchman Pete
 West of the Brazos (1950) - Henchman Sam
 The Lone Ranger (1950, TV Series) - Jeff Garth
 Fast on the Draw (1950) - Outlaw Leader
 Rio Grande Patrol (1950) - Chet Yance
 Dick Tracy (1950, TV Series) - Coffyhead
 Trail of Robin Hood (1950) - Himself
 The Cisco Kid (1950–1951, TV Series) - Sheriff Jim Turner
 The Great Missouri Raid (1951) - Allen Parmer
 Best of the Badmen (1951) - Frank James
 Mysterious Island (1951) - Union Dispatch Rider (uncredited)
 The Adventures of Wild Bill Hickok (1951–1952, TV Series) - Sheriff
 The Roy Rogers Show (1952, TV Series) - Henchman / Andy
 Boston Blackie (1951–1952, TV Series)
 Road Agent (1952) - Larkin - Henchman
 Outlaw Women (1952) - Chillawaka Charlie
 The Lion and the Horse (1952) - Bud Sabin
 What Price Glory (1952) - Capt. Davis (uncredited)
 Sky King (1952, TV Series) - Al
 Cowboy G-Men (1952, TV Series) - Henchman Cactus
 The Range Rider (1951–1952, TV Series) - Shotgun Guard / Indian
 Cow Country (1953) - Pete
 The Gene Autry Show (1952–1953, TV series) - Lanky henchman at Hideout / Slender Thug in the White Hat / Henchman Snake-Eye

References

Bibliography

External links

 
Tom Tyler fansite

1903 births
1954 deaths
20th-century American male actors
American male film actors
American male silent film actors
American people of Lithuanian descent
Male film serial actors
Male actors from New York (state)
People from Port Henry, New York
People from Hamtramck, Michigan
Male Western (genre) film actors
Deaths from scleroderma